Tobias Graf (born 17 March 1984 in Loßburg) is a Paralympic track cyclist for Germany. He has won medals at the 2004, 2008, and 2012 Summer Paralympics.

References

External links
 

1984 births
Living people
German male cyclists
Paralympic cyclists of Germany
Paralympic silver medalists for Germany
Paralympic bronze medalists for Germany
Paralympic medalists in cycling
Cyclists at the 2004 Summer Paralympics
Cyclists at the 2008 Summer Paralympics
Cyclists at the 2012 Summer Paralympics
Medalists at the 2004 Summer Paralympics
Medalists at the 2008 Summer Paralympics
Medalists at the 2012 Summer Paralympics
People from Freudenstadt (district)
Sportspeople from Karlsruhe (region)
Cyclists from Baden-Württemberg
21st-century German people